Before Auschwitz: Jewish Prisoners in the Prewar Concentration Camps is a book by Kim Wünschmann, published by Harvard University Press in 2015, which deals with Jewish prisoners in Nazi concentration camps before the Holocaust.

References

Harvard University Press books
2015 non-fiction books
History books about Nazi concentration camps